Lexicographic max-min optimization (also called lexmaxmin or leximin or leximax or lexicographic max-ordering optimization) is a kind of multi-objective optimization. In general, multi-objective optimization deals with optimization problems with two or more objective functions to be optimized simultaneously. Lexmaxmin optimization presumes that the decision-maker would like the smallest objective value to be as high as possible; subject to this, the second-smallest objective should be as high as possible; and so on. In other words, the decision-maker ranks the possible solutions according to a leximin order of their objective function values.

As an example, consider egalitarian social planners, who want to decide on a policy such that the utility of the poorest person will be as high as possible; subject to this, they want to maximize the utility of the second-poorest person; and so on. This planner solves a lexmaxmin problem, where the objective function number i is the utility of agent number i.

An early application of lexmaxmin (not using this name) was presented by Melvin Dresher in his book on game theory, in the context of taking maximum advantage of the opponent's mistakes in a zero-sum game. Behringer cites many other examples in game theory as well as decision theory.

Notation 

Comparison with lexicographic optimization 

Lexmaxmin optimization is closely related to lexicographic optimization. However, in lexicographic optimization, there is a fixed order on the functions, such that  is the most important,  is the next-most important, and so on. In contrast, in lexmaxmin, all the objectives are equally important. To present lexmaxmin as a special case of lexicographic optimization, denote by  the smallest objective value in x. Similarly, denote by  the second-smallest objective value in x, and so on, so that . Then, the lexmaxmin optimization problem can be written as the following lexicographic maximization problem:

Properties 
(1) Uniqueness. In general, a lexmaxmin optimization problem may have more than one optimal solution. However, the unsorted value vectors may be different. For example, (1,2,3) and (2,1,3) may both be optimal solutions to the same problem.

However, if the feasible domain is a convex set, and the objectives are concave functions, then the value vectors in all optimal solutions must be the same, since if there were two different optimal solutions, their mean would be another feasible solution in which the objective functions attain a higher value - contradicting the optimality of the original solutions.

Algorithms for continuous variables

Saturation Algorithm for convex problems 
The Saturation Algorithm works when the feasible set is a convex set, and the objectives are concave functions. It was presented by Stephen J. Willson, and by other authors.

The algorithm keeps a set of objectives that are considered saturated (also called: blocking). This means that their value cannot be improved without harming lower-valued objectives. The other objectives are called free. Initially, all objectives are free. The algorithm works as follows:

 While some objective is free:
 (P1) Solve the following single-objective problem, where  is the saturation value of objective :
 If the problem is infeasible or unbounded, stop and declare that there is no solution.
 Otherwise, find a saturated objective as follows:
 For every free objective :
 (P2) Solve the following single-objective problem, where  is the maximum value of the first problem:
 End for
 End while

At each step, at least one free objective must become saturated. This is because, if no objective were saturated, then the mean of all optimal solutions to (P2) would be a feasible solution in which all objective values are larger than  - contradicting the optimality of solution to (P1). For example, suppose , objective 1 is not saturated because there is a solution with value-vector (3,1), and objective 2 is not saturated because there exists a solution with value-vector and (1,3). Then, there exists a solution with value-vector at least (2,2), but  should have been at least 2.

Therefore, after at most n iterations, all variables are saturated and a leximin-optimal solution is found. In each iteration t, the algorithm solves at most n-t+1 linear programs; therefore, the run-time of the algorithm is at most  times the run-time of the LP solver.

In some cases, the run-time of the saturation algorithm can be improved. Instead of finding all saturated objectives, we can break out of the inner loop after finding one saturated objective; the algorithm still stops after at most n iterations, and may reduce the number of linear programs (P2) we need to solve.

Furthermore, instead of looping over all objectives to find a saturated one, the algorithm can find a saturated objective using the dual problem of (P1). In some cases, the dual variables are given as a byproduct of solving (P1), for example, when the objectives and constraints are linear and the solver is the simplex algorithm. In this case, (P2) is not needed at all, and the run-time of the algorithm is at most  times the run-time of the solver of (P1).

All these variants work only for convex problems. For non-convex problems, there might be no saturated objective, so the algorithm might not stop.

Ordered Outcomes Algorithm for general problems 

The Ordered Outcomes Algorithm works in arbitrary domains (not necessarily convex). It was developed by Ogryczak and Śliwiński and also presented in the context of telecommunication networks by Ogryczak, Pioro and Tomaszewski, and in the context of location problems by Ogryczak. The algorithm reduces lexmaxmin optimization to the easier problem of lexicographic optimization. Lexicographic optimization can be done with a simple sequential algorithm, which solves at most n linear programs. The reduction starts with the following presentation of lexmaxmin:

This problem cannot be solved as-is, because  (the t-th smallest value in ) is not a simple function of x. The problem (L1) is equivalent to the following problem, where  the sum of the t smallest values in :

For every t, the sum  can be computed as the optimal value to the following problem, with n+1 auxiliary variables (an unbounded variable , and non-negative variables  for all j in 1,...,n), and n additional constraints:Proof. Let us compute the values of the auxiliary variables in the optimal solution.

Therefore, . So the objective can be written as:  . 
 For any k between 0 and n, if  is larger than the smallest k objective values (that is), then the sum at the right-hand side contains exactly k positive elements: . In that case, the objective can be written as:  . Note that  is increasing with  when k<t, and decreasing with  when k>t.  Therefore, the maximum value is attained when k=t, that is,  is larger than the smallest t objective values; in that case, the objective exactly equals , as claimed.
Therefore, the problem (L2) is equivalent to the following lexicographic maximization problem:

This problem (L4) has  additional variables, and  additional constraints. It can be solved by every algorithm for solving lexicographic maximization, for example: the sequential algorithm using n linear programs, or the lexicographic simplex algorithm (if the objectives and constraints are linear).

Ordered Values Algorithm for general problems 
The Ordered Values Algorithm works in any domain in which the set of possible values of the objective functions is finite. It was developed by Ogryczak and Śliwiński.  Let  be the set of all values that can be returned by the functions , such that . Given a solution x, and an integer k in {1,..,r}, define  as the number of occurences of the value vr in the vector  .   Then, the lexmaxmin problem can be stated as the following lexicographic minimization problem:since we want to have as few as possible functions attaining the smallest value; subject to this, as few as possible functions attaining the next-smallest value; and so on. Ogryczak and Śliwiński show how to transform this non-linear program into a linear program with auxiliary variables. In their computational experiments, the Ordered Values algorithm runs much faster than the Saturation algorithm and the Ordered Outcomes algorithm.

Behringer's algorithm for quasiconcave functions 
Behringer presented a sequential algorithm for lexmaxmin optimization when the objectives are quasiconvex functions, and the feasible set X is a convex set.

Weighted average 
Yager presented a way to represent the leximin ordering analytically using the Ordered weighted averaging aggregation operator. He assumes that all objective values are real numbers between 0 and 1, and the smallest difference between any two possible values is some constant d < 1 (so that values with difference smaller than d are considered equal). This guarantees that maximizing the weighted sum  is equivalent to lexmaxmin.

Algorithms for discrete variables 
If the set of vectors is discrete, and the domain is sufficiently small, then it is possible to use one of the functions representing the leximin order, and maximize it subject to the constraints, using a solver for constraint-satisfaction problems.

But if the domain is large, the above approach becomes unfeasible due to the large number of possible values that this function can have: , where m is the number of different values in the domain, and n is the number of variables.

Bouveret and Lemaître present five different algorithms for finding leximin-optimal solutions to discrete constraint-satisfaction problems:

 Branch and bound based on the LEXIMIN constraint - a constraint on two vectors x and y, saying that y is leximin-larger than x.
 Branching on saturated subsets - finding subsets of variables that must be fixed at the minimum value, and finding the maximum-minimum value for the other variables.
 Using the SORT constraint - a constraint on two vectors x and y, saying that y contains the same elements as x sorted in ascending order. This constraint can be computed efficiently by several algorithms.
 Using the ATLEAST constraint.
 Using max-min transformations.

In their experiments, the best-performing approach was 4 (ATLEAST), followed by 3 (SORT) followed by 1 (LEXIMIN).

Dall'aglio presents an algorithm for computing a leximin-optimal resource allocation.

See also 

 In game theory, the nucleolus is defined as a lexicographically minimal solution set.

References 

Multiple-criteria decision analysis
Optimization algorithms and methods